The Grinding House is a collection of short stories by Kaaron Warren published in 2005 by the Canberra Speculative Fiction Guild. The collection was edited by Donna Maree Hanson. Warren won the 2006 Fiction ACT Writers and Publishers Award for The Grinding House.

Stories

The collection contains the following stories:

 "Fresh Young Widow"
 "The Glass Woman"
 "The Blue Stream"
 "The Hanging People"
 "Smoko"
 "A-Positive"
 "The Missing Children"
 "Al's Iso Bar"
 "The Left Behind"
 "Tiger Kill"
 "The Wrong Seat"
 "Skin Holes"
 "The Sameness of Birthdays"
 "The Speaker of Heaven"
 "The Smell of Mice"
 "The Grinding House"
 "Survival of the Last"
 "Salamander"
 "Working for the God of the Love of Money"

The cover art is by Robyn Evans.

See also

 Nor of human
 Machinations: An Anthology of Ingenious Designs
 Elsewhere
 Encounters
 The Outcast
 Gastronomicon

Notes

External links
CSFG home page

2005 short story collections
Australian short story collections
Speculative fiction short story collections